Jakub Giża (born 26 April 1985) is a Polish shot putter. Born in Bielawa.

Achievements

References

1985 births
Living people
Polish male shot putters
People from Bielawa
Sportspeople from Lower Silesian Voivodeship